Jeremy Nicholas Rae (born May 19, 1991) is a Canadian middle-distance track athlete. Rae competed for Notre Dame during his collegiate career. He holds various school records and won an NCAA Championship in the Distance Medley Relay in 2012. Rae has also represented Canada internationally in various world track meets. Jeremy is now a professional cyclist, attempting the Canadian everesting record. He is based out of Hamilton, Ontario and organizes a ride for elite cyclists in the Hamilton-Wentworth area called "Durand".

Running career

High school
Rae attended Lakeshore Catholic High School in Ontario for which he set the Penn Relays high school record in the 1600 meters with a time of 4:08 (min:sec). While still in high school, Rae finished in second place in the 1500 meters at the 2009 Pan American Junior Athletics Championships.

Collegiate and international
Rae was recruited by Notre Dame. Rae finished in fifth place overall for the 1500 meters at the 2013 NCAA DI Outdoor T&F Championships. Just a month after the NCAA Outdoor Championships, Rae represented Canada at the 2013 Summer Universiade, finishing second to Valentin Smirnov, earning a silver medal from the men's 1500 meter.

On February 7, 2014, Rae won Note Dame's Meyo Invitational mile race in a time of 3:57.25, breaking Notre Dame's previous mile record of 3:57.83 set by Luke Watson in 2002. At the 2014 NCAA DI Indoor T&F Championships, Rae finished the indoor mile finals in ninth place.

References

1991 births
Canadian male middle-distance runners
Living people
Notre Dame Fighting Irish men's track and field athletes
Athletes from Hamilton, Ontario
Sportspeople from Fort Erie, Ontario
Track and field athletes from Ontario
Universiade medalists in athletics (track and field)
Universiade silver medalists for Canada
Medalists at the 2013 Summer Universiade